WBNH-LP is an alternative rock formatted broadcast radio station licensed to Bedford, New Hampshire, serving Manchester, and its immediate southern and western suburbs  in New Hampshire.  WBNH-LP is owned and operated by Town of Bedford, New Hampshire.

The station was assigned the WBNH-LP call sign on November 6, 2014, and was licensed on February 8, 2016.

References

External links
 105-1 WBNH Online
 

2016 establishments in New Hampshire
Alternative rock radio stations in the United States
Radio stations established in 2016
BNH-LP
BNH-LP
Bedford, New Hampshire